Virstatin is a small molecule that inhibits the activity of the cholera protein, ToxT.

Its activity in cholera was first published in 2005 in a paper that described the screening of a chemical library in a phenotypic screen and subsequent testing of one of the hits in infected mice.

The compound is an isoquinoline alkaloid and can be synthesized by a simple two-step synthesis

References 

Cholera
Carboxylic acids
Imides